Frühwirth is a surname. Notable people with the surname include:

 Andreas Frühwirth (1845–1933), Austrian friar of the Dominican Order
 David Frühwirth (born 1974), Austrian violinist
 Eduard Frühwirth (1908–1973), Austrian football player and manager
 Hans Frühwirth, Austrian slalom canoeist
 Josef Frühwirth (1907–1944), Austrian international footballer